Mirza Delibašić Memorial is an international basketball tournament between clubs, which has been held annually since 2005 by Bosna and takes place in Sarajevo, Bosnia and Herzegovina each summer. It was named in honor of basketball player Mirza Delibašić.

Winners

References

Basketball competitions in Bosnia and Herzegovina
Sports competitions in Sarajevo
KK Bosna Royal
Recurring sporting events established in 2005